(also spelt Ohno), born November 14, 1988, is a Japanese actor and talent. He has had roles in such films as The Incite Mill and Liar Game: Reborn.

Filmography

Film 
 The Incite Mill (2010) – Yukito Maki
 Liar Game: Reborn (2012) – Tatsushi Wada
 Saitama kazoku (2013)
 Black Butler (2014) – Takaaki Matsumiya
 Nutcracker Fantasy (2014)
 Sailor Suit and Machine Gun: Graduation (2016)
 Kōdai-ke no Hitobito (2016)
 Survival Family (2017)
 The Travelling Cat Chronicles (2018)

Television 
 Kokoro Yusabure! Sempai Rock You (2011) – Himself
 Misaki Number One (2011) – Yuto Hoshida
 Bull Doctor (2012) – Shunsuke Fujimura
 The Higashino Keigo Mysteries (2012)
 Nekketsu Kouha Kunio-kun (2013) – Kunio
 SPEC:Zero (2013 TV Movie)
 Onna Rule (2013) – Hayato Kozuka
 Sanbiki no ossan (2013) – Yuki
 Hana Moyu (2015) – Yasushi Nomura
 Toto Neechan (2015) – Kiyoshi Aoyagi
 Warotenka (2017–18) – Keith
 Segodon (2018) – Kirino Toshiaki

References

External links
 
 

People from Itabashi
Living people
20th-century Japanese male actors
21st-century Japanese male actors
Japanese male television actors
1988 births